Sayo (written: 沙世, 沙代 or 紗世) is a feminine Japanese given name. Notable people with the name include:

, Japanese model and television personality
, Japanese fashion model
, Japanese long-distance runner
, Japanese handball player
, Japanese anime director
, founder of the Tenshō Kōtai Jingūkyō

Fictional characters
, a character in the manga series Negima!
, a character in the manga series Double-J
, a character in the manga series Triage X
, a character in the media franchise BanG Dream!
, a character in the manga series A.I. Love You
, a character in the OVA series One Off
, a character in the manga series Gals!
Sayo Oharu (大治 小夜), a character in the tokusatsu series Mashin Sentai Kiramager
, a character in the manga series My Girlfriend is Shobitch
, a character in the manga series Recorder and Randsell
, a character in the manga series Sora no Manimani
, a character in the visual novel Umineko When They Cry
, a character in the video game Shikigami no Shiro
, a character in the online game and anime series "Touken Ranbu"

Japanese feminine given names